Sir Conyers Darcy or Darcey,  (c. 16851 December 1758), of Aske, near Richmond, Yorkshire, was a British Army officer, courtier and Whig politician who sat in the House of Commons between 1707 and 1758.

Early life

Darcy was the second surviving son of Hon. John Darcy, MP, and his wife Bridget Sutton, daughter of Robert Sutton, 1st Baron Lexington. He was the younger brother of Robert Darcy, 3rd Earl of Holderness. He was probably educated at Eton College in 1698 and matriculated fellow-commoner from King's College, Cambridge in 1703. He joined the army and was cornet and major in the 1st Life Guards from 1706 to 1715.

Career
Darcy was returned as Member of Parliament for Yorkshire at a by-election on 3 December 1707,  but was defeated at the 1708 general election. He refused to stand at the 1710 general election. In 1710 he became gentleman of horse and in 1711, avener and clerk martial. From 1712 to 1714, he was one of the commissioners for the office of Master of the Horse.

At the 1715 general election, Darcy was returned as Member of Parliament for Newark. He was appointed commissioner for the office of Master of the Horse again in 1715. He went into opposition with Walpole in 1717, and voted against the Government on several occasions, so he lost all his official posts. When the WHigs subsequently came together again, he was appointed Master of the Household in 1720. At the 1722 general election he was returned at Boroughbridge  and at Richmond and chose to sit at Richmond. In 1725, he was invested  as a Founder Knight Commander of the Order of the Bath. In 1727, he was appointed Lord Lieutenant of the North Riding of Yorkshire holding the post until 1740. He was initially defeated at the poll at the 1727 general election, but was seated on petition on 14 March 1728. He was promoted to the post of Comptroller of the Household and was sworn a Privy Counsellor in 1730.  He was returned for Richmond again at the general elections of 1734 and 1741. At the 1747 he was returned again for Yorkshire and Richmond and this time chose to sit for Yorkshire. He was re-elected for Yorkshire in the 1754 general election.

Family and legacy
Darcy married Mary Lady Capell, widow of Algernon Capell, 2nd Earl of Essex and daughter of Hans William Bentinck, 1st Earl of Portland in August 1714. He bought Aske Hall near Richmond, North Yorkshire in 1722 and extensively remodelled it. His wife died on 20 August 1726 and on 12 September 1728 he married Elizabeth, twice widowed daughter of John Rotherham of Much Waltham, Essex. Her former husbands were Sir Theophilus Napier, 5th Baronet, of Luton Hoo, Bedfordshire, and Thomas Howard, 6th Lord Howard of Effingham). He was a founding governor of the Foundling Hospital in London, a charity set up to care for foundlings (abandoned children). 

Darcy died without issue on 1 December 1758.  Aske Hall was sold in 1763 by Robert Darcy, 4th Earl of Holderness to Sir Lawrence Dundas, 1st Baronet.

References

|-

1680s births
1758 deaths
Members of the Parliament of Great Britain for English constituencies
Members of the Privy Council of Great Britain
British MPs 1707–1708
British MPs 1708–1710
British MPs 1710–1713
British MPs 1713–1715
British MPs 1715–1722
British MPs 1722–1727
British MPs 1727–1734
British MPs 1734–1741
British MPs 1741–1747
British MPs 1747–1754
British MPs 1754–1761
Knights Companion of the Order of the Bath
Lord-Lieutenants of the East Riding of Yorkshire
Lord-Lieutenants of the North Riding of Yorkshire
Masters of the Household